Chamlang is a mountain in the Nepalese Himalayas, near Makalu. It lies in the southern section of the Mahalangur subrange of the Himalayas.

In 2021 a new, direct line up the sheer north face was climbed by two French mountain guides, Charles Dubouloz and Benjamin Vedrines. Climbing just as a pair, the route, which they named 'In the Shadow of Lies', took them four days to complete and included ice up to 90°.

See also 
 List of mountains in Nepal

References 

Seven-thousanders of the Himalayas
Mountains of Koshi Province